Wabash and Erie Canal Culvert #100, also known as Burnett's Creek Arch and County Bridge #181, is a historic culvert built for the Wabash and Erie Canal and located at Adams Township, Carroll County, Indiana. It was built in 1840, and is a semicircular span measuring 20 feet long, 10 feet high, and 87 feet, 6 inches wide.  It is constructed of limestone slabs.  The culvert now supports a county roadway.

It was listed on the National Register of Historic Places in 2002.

References

Buildings and structures completed in 1840
National Register of Historic Places in Carroll County, Indiana
Road bridges on the National Register of Historic Places in Indiana
Transportation buildings and structures in Carroll County, Indiana